Bleselumab (INN; development code ASKP1240) is a human monoclonal antibody designed for the prevention of organ transplant rejection.

This drug was developed by Kyowa Kirin Pharmaceutical Development Inc.

References 

Monoclonal antibodies